Mohammad Shoffi bin Jikan (born 13 November 1970) is a Malaysian actor, singer, and director.

Personal life
On 13 May 2019, Sofi was ordered to defend himself by Mahkamah Petaling Jaya on charges of using marijuana.

Filmography

Film

Television series

Telemovie

Television

Discography

References

External links
 

Malaysian male actors
21st-century Malaysian male actors
People from Terengganu
Malaysian people of Malay descent
1970 births
Living people